The Mosquito Problem and Other Stories is a Bulgarian documentary feature film directed by Andrey Paounov and written by professor Lilia Topouzova. It was included in the 46th International Critics' Week of the Cannes Film Festival in 2007.

Plot

The city of Belene is about to embark on a bright new journey. Massive rusty cranes, foreign investors, and the joyful chants of cheerleaders carry the dream of a great nuclear future, with the planned Belene Nuclear Power Plant. Disturbed only by gigantic stinging mosquitoes, the townsfolk celebrate the atomic achievement by engraving the nuclear power plant logo on buildings and soup bowls. Amidst the apparent atomic prosperity lies a past that no one wants to remember: the Belene labour camp. Stories of crime loom over the city just like the dark clouds of mosquitoes descending on its citizens.

The film depicts a world transformed by ideologies, regimes, and dreams of economic prosperity. It tells a tale of characters whose lives intersect in a sinister past, nuclear future, and the stinging mosquitoes flying through time, sealing their fate together.

The idea for the film started with the years-long research of professor Lilia Topouzova, a historian and filmmaker who studies the Bulgarian Gulag camps through the use of archival and ethnographical research and oral history. Later on, she collaborated with the filmmaker Andrey Paounov, who directed the film.

Reception
The film had its world premiere at the 46th International Critics' Week of the Cannes Film Festival in 2007, and was screened at international film festivals including Toronto International Film Festival, Karlovy Vary International Film Festival, Busan International Film Festival, and London Film Festival. It was released in Bulgarian cinemas in 2008.

Awards
The Times BFI London Film Festival Grierson Award
First Prize of the Jury Festival Internacional de Documentales de Madrid
Human Rights Award Sarajevo Film Festival
Special Jury Mention Karlovy Vary Award Winners 2007
Grand Prize Sunny Side of the Doc 2008 Award, by Panavision
Best film OFF Docúpolis section at Festival Documental Internacional de Barcelona
Grand Prix - Docufest, International Documentary and Short FF, Prizren, Kosovo
The Best Documentary Award at MEDIAWAVE
Best Documentary at the 15th L'Alternativa - Barcelona Independent Film Festival
Best full-length non-feature film – Shaken’s Stars IFF 2008, Almaty,  Kazakhstan
A-to-A Award for best regional film - Motovun FF, Croatia
Honorary Mention at the 8th goEast Festival of Central and Eastern European Film
Special Mention - BRITDOC Festival, Oxford
Zolotoy Vityaz (The Golden Knight Award) Moscow
Nominated for the Adolf Grimme Award

References

Weissberg, Jay (Variety 19, 2007)
Southern,Nathan ( All Movie Guide)
Wollaston, Sam (The Guardian, Wednesday 14 November 2007)
Ambrose, Dominic (wordpress)
46e SEMAINE DE LA CRITIQUE
DC NEWS

External links
 

Documenta Madrid 
Karlovy Vary International Film Festival, http://www.kviff.com/en/history-years/2007/
 ITVS International

Bulgarian documentary films
Films shot in Bulgaria
2007 films
Films directed by Andrey Paounov
Belene
2007 documentary films